Jewish Koine Greek, or Jewish Hellenistic Greek, is the variety of Koine Greek or "common Attic" found in a number of Alexandrian dialect texts of Hellenistic Judaism, most notably in the Septuagint translation of the Hebrew Bible and associated literature, as well as in Greek Jewish texts from Palestine. The term is largely equivalent with Greek of the Septuagint as a cultural and literary rather than a linguistic category. The minor syntax and vocabulary variations in the Koine Greek of Jewish authors are not as linguistically distinctive as the later language Yevanic, or Judeo-Greek, spoken by the Romaniote Jews in Greece.

The term "Jewish Koine" is to be distinguished from the concept of a "Jewish koine" as a literary-religious, not a linguistic concept.

History of scholarship
Primary work on this area was conducted by scholars such as Henry Barclay Swete in chapter 4 of his Introduction to the Old Testament in Greek. However, Swete's emphasis on the peculiarity of the Greek of the Septuagint compared to other Greek texts of the period has largely been retracted by later scholars as plentiful non-Jewish Koine domestic and administrative papyri and inscriptions have been better recovered and studied. Since Swete the equation of Jewish common Attic with the "Greek of the Septuagint" has also been broadened, placing the Septuagint in the context of a wide range of Jewish texts of the period, most recently including the Greek texts among the Dead Sea scrolls.

No ancient or medieval writer recognizes a distinct Jewish dialect of Greek. General academic consensus is that the Greek used in the Jewish Koine Greek texts does not differ significantly enough from pagan Koine Greek texts to be described as "Jewish Greek." This also applies to the language of the New Testament. Due to the dominant influence of the Septuagint the first documents of "Christian Greek" and early "Patristic Greek" are both an extension of classical Greek on the one hand, and of biblical and Jewish-Hellenistic Greek on the other.

Only a thousand years later did there arise a true Jewish dialect of Greek, Yevanic.<ref>Steven M. Lowenstein The Jewish Cultural Tapestry: International Jewish Folk Traditions – Page 19 – 2002 "From 3000 to 5000 Jews in the Yanina region (Epirus) of northern Greece who spoke a Jewish dialect of Greek, unlike the other Greek Jews, who spoke Judeo-Spanish (see group 3). 9. From 1500 to 2000 Jews of Cochin in southern India, ..."</ref>

Grammar
Koine Greek grammar already departs from earlier Greek grammar in several areas, but the Jewish texts are generally consistent with Gentile texts, with the exception of a small number of grammatical semitisms. As would be expected many Jewish texts show virtually no departures from the Koine or "common Attic" used by Gentile authors. Authors writing for Gentile audiences such as Josephus and Philo of Alexandria observe a standard of Greek grammar well above that of many surviving pagan sources.

Neologisms
A major difference between the Septuagint, and associated literature, and contemporary non-Jewish Koine texts is the presence of a number of pure neologisms (new coinages) or new usage of vocabulary.Johan Lust, Erik Eynikel and Katrin Hauspie. Greek-English Lexicon of the Septuagint 2008 Preface However hapax legomena may not always indicate neologisms, given the specialist subject matter of the Septuagint. Also some of the "neologisms" of the Septuagint are not totally new coinages and may be combinations of existing terms as Neubildungen'' in German, such as the large number of compound words representing two or more Hebrew words.

Examples
 : "to judaize" (Galatians 2:14, see Judaizers)
 : "(I) keep the sabbath"
 : "false prophet" (classical texts use  )

See also
 Koine Greek phonology
 History of the Jews in Alexandria

References

Varieties of Ancient Greek
Septuagint
Jewish languages